Pennsylvania Station, also known as Newark Penn Station, is an intermodal passenger station in Newark, New Jersey. One of the New York metropolitan area's major transportation hubs, Newark Penn Station is served by multiple rail and bus carriers, making it the seventh busiest rail station in the United States, and the fourth busiest in the New York City metropolitan area. 

Located at Raymond Plaza between Market Street and Raymond Boulevard, the station is served by three NJ Transit commuter rail lines, the Newark Light Rail, the PATH rapid transit system, and all 11 of Amtrak's Northeast Corridor services, including the Acela. The station is also Newark's main intercity bus terminal; it is served by carriers Greyhound, Bolt, and Fullington Trailways. Additionally, it is served by 33 local and regional bus lines operated by NJ Transit Bus Operations and Coach USA (Orange-Newark-Elizabeth).

History

Designed by the renowned architectural firm McKim, Mead & White, the same team behind the Pennsylvania Railroad's famed original New York Penn Station twelve miles to the east, the station has Art Deco and Neo-Classical features. The main waiting room has medallions showing the history of transportation, from wagons to steamships to cars and airplanes, the eventual doom of the railroad age. Chandeliers are decorated with Zodiac signs. The building was dedicated on March 23, 1935; the first regular train to use it was a New York–Philadelphia express at 10:17 on March 24.

The new station was built alongside (northwest of) the old station, which was then demolished and replaced by the southeast half of the present station, completed in 1937. Except for the separate, underground Newark Light Rail station, all tracks are above street level.

It was to be one of the centerpieces of Pennsylvania Railroad's (PRR's) train network, and to become a transfer point to the Hudson and Manhattan Railroad (now PATH), which was partially funded by the PRR, for travel to lower Manhattan. PRR then scheduled 232 weekday trains through Newark, about two-thirds of them to or from New York Penn Station and the rest to/from Jersey City.

The station itself, the adjacent 230-foot Dock Bridge over the Passaic River (the longest three-track railway lift span in existence at the time) and the realignments of the Newark City Subway (now Newark Light Rail) and H&M cost $42 million, borne almost evenly by the PRR and the City of Newark. The City Subway extension and H&M realignment opened on June 20, 1937, and the nearby Manhattan Transfer station was closed, along with the H&M's original Park Place station.

The Port of New York Authority (now the Port Authority of New York and New Jersey) bought the bankrupt H&M Railroad and reorganized it as Port Authority Trans-Hudson in 1962. New Jersey Department of Transportation's Aldene Plan redirected Central Railroad of New Jersey and Reading Railroad trains from Communipaw Terminal in Jersey City to Newark Penn Station in 1967. The Pennsylvania Railroad merged with longtime rival New York Central Railroad in 1968 to form Penn Central Railroad, but Newark kept the name "Penn Station." In 1970, Penn Station became the sole intercity station in Newark when the Erie Lackawanna ran its last intercity trains through Broad Street Station.

After Amtrak took over inter-city service in 1971, Penn Central continued to operate commuter service, despite being bankrupt. In 1976 the New Jersey Department of Transportation acquired Penn Central, Reading and Jersey Central passenger service, which included lines from as far away as Philadelphia's SEPTA diesel service along the West Trenton Line, with Conrail operating service under contract. New Jersey Transit acquired the rail line north of West Trenton in 1982, and established its rail operations division in 1983, acquiring almost all commuter rail service from Conrail within the state.

Newark Penn Station was extensively renovated in 2007, with restoration of the facade and historic interior materials (e.g., plaster ceilings, marble and limestone, windows, lighting fixtures), as well as train platform and equipment improvements.

In August 2019 the United States Department of Transportation awarded $18.4 million to NJ Transit to rehabilitate and repair Platform "D" that serves Tracks 3 & 4 and is a major transfer point for Amtrak and NJ Transit.

Current operations
Despite being  from New York Penn, the busiest train station in North America, Newark Penn is a major station in its own right. In 2014 it was the 14th busiest station in the Amtrak system, the eighth busiest in the Mid-Atlantic region (behind New York Penn, Washington Union, Philadelphia, Baltimore Penn, Albany-Rensselaer, BWI Airport and Wilmington) and by far the busiest of the six Amtrak stations in New Jersey. This is mainly because since the 1970s, it has been the only intercity rail station in heavily populated northeastern New Jersey.

It is served by all 11 services running along the Northeast Corridor, providing a second option for Amtrak riders traveling through the New York area. 

Newark Penn Station carries the IATA airport code of ZRP.

NJ Transit commuter rail
Three NJ Transit commuter rail lines converge here: the Northeast Corridor Line, North Jersey Coast Line and the Raritan Valley Line. The former two continue to New York at all times via Secaucus Junction. The Raritan Valley Line generally terminates here, with the exception of certain off-peak weekday trains that continue to New York and one inbound weekday train that continues to Hoboken. Formerly, the North Jersey Coast Line also offered limited service to Hoboken, though present-day schedules have eliminated this service.
Due to the wide availability of these routes, as well as the Northeast Regional and Acela Express, passengers are not usually allowed to use Amtrak's long distance trains to Florida, New Orleans, or Chicago for local travel between Newark and New York.

PATH

Newark Penn is the western terminus of the Newark–World Trade Center line of the PATH train, operated by the Port Authority of New York and New Jersey. Trains discharge on Platform H (upper level) and return to service on the lower level (platform B/C). Until the opening of Secaucus Junction in 2003, NJ Transit commuter rail passengers and Amtrak intercity passengers had to transfer to PATH here in order to reach Jersey City or Hoboken.

Newark Light Rail

On the lower level is the southern terminus of the Newark Light Rail (formerly the Newark City Subway), with three outbound tracks and two inbound tracks. Passengers on this light rail system from Newark and its nearby suburbs can transfer to Amtrak, NJ Transit or PATH trains, or travel to Newark Broad Street or downtown Newark. The Broad Street extension, opened in 2006, was intended to ease transfers between the former Erie Lackawanna commuter routes that call at Broad Street and the Amtrak and former PRR commuter routes that call at Newark Penn. Previously, passengers had to make their own way (usually by taxi or bus) between the two stations.

Tracks and platforms

Newark Penn has 8 tracks and 6 platforms for both NJT and PATH (Newark Light Rail not included), but PATH trains from NYC arrive on the upper level and ones from South Street arrive on the lower level.

Track A is less used and has a side platform, usually for Raritan Valley Line arrivals. Trains relay and lay-up at Hudson Yard in Harrison before returning on Track 5 for the reverse trip. Occasionally used by Amtrak trains to New York Penn Station.
Track 1 is normally used by New Jersey Transit trains to New York Penn Station and is served by an island platform shared with Track M.
Track 2 is typically used by northbound Amtrak and New Jersey Transit express trains, but is also used during the PM rush for westbound North Jersey Coast Line express trains. This track has an island platform that is shared with track M.
Track 3 is usually used by southbound Amtrak trains, though westbound New Jersey Transit Northeast Corridor Line express trains will often use this track in the evening rush hours. This platform has an island platform shared with track 4.
Track 4 is normally used by westbound New Jersey Transit trains traveling via Newark Airport or Rahway.
Track 5 is usually used by westbound Raritan Valley Line trains and weekend eastbound Raritan Valley Line trains terminating. This track has a side platform. This track has closed periodically since 2013.
Track M is the track for departing PATH trains to World Trade Center in Lower Manhattan.
Track H is for discharging PATH trains. This upper-level track, which did not have turnstiles until SmartLink ones were installed in 2005, has stairs to Track 2, along with ramps to Tracks 3 and 4, and a separate stairway to Track 5. Trains relay and lay-up south of the station before returning on Track M for the trip to World Trade Center. There are two pairs of crossover switches south of the station for that purpose, as well as a center track from which trains can be reversed quickly.

Platform layout
Note: Shows platform layouts only, not the actual station layout.

Gallery

Sources and notes

External links

Newark Pennsylvania Station (USA RailGuide -- TrainWeb)
PATH - Newark Station

Newark
Newark
Newark Light Rail stations
Newark
PATH stations in New Jersey
Newark
Former SEPTA Regional Rail stations
Former Reading Company stations
Transportation in Newark, New Jersey
Transit centers in the United States
Bus transportation in New Jersey
Transit hubs serving New Jersey
McKim, Mead & White buildings
Former Lehigh Valley Railroad stations
Railway stations in the United States opened in 1935
Railway stations on the National Register of Historic Places in New Jersey
Buildings and structures in Newark, New Jersey
Art Deco architecture in New Jersey
1935 establishments in New Jersey